Khaliq Abad Mangocher is a city located in Qalat district, Balochistan, in Pakistan. There are 65,678 people who live in Mangocher as of the 2017 Pakistan Census and all of the population is rural.

History 
The Khan of Qalat, Mir Mahbat Khan was defeated by the Afghans near Mangocher and he fled to Qalat.  The Afghans retook Mangocher in 1747.  In 1899 Kalat State Forces disbanded in Mangocher.

Armed conflict 

The Balochistan Liberation Army has committed numerous atrocities in Mangocher by killing civilians and destroying infrastructure during the Insurgency in Balochistan.  Many residents have also opposed both the BLA and the Pakistani government due to the ban of import of vegetables and plants to neighboring Afghanistan, especially the landlords.

2022 Pakistan floods 
Many parts of Mangcher have been underwater since the 2022 Pakistan Floods began in May throughout September as well as Qalat which caused the power to go out for most of the time.

2022 shooting 
Unknown members of a group opened fire on civilians in Mangocher with one person killed and one injured.  The attackers escaped, but are assumed to be from the Balochistan Liberation Army, a militant group active in Balochistan.

References

Populated places in Kalat District